Christiane Maria dos Santos Torloni (born 18 February 1957) is a Brazilian actress.

Biography and career 
Her first appearance was on the Brazilian TV network Rede Globo. Among the many characters she has played are Jô Penteado in A Gata Comeu (1985), and Fernanda in Selva de Pedra. In 1981, Torloni played first daughter Helena, a character created by Manoel Carlos in the telenovela Baila Comigo. Torloni also starred in the popular Brazilian telenovela Mulheres Apaixonadas. and appears in the role of Rebeca Bianchi on the telenovela Ti Ti Ti. In addition to her television and film career, Torloni has performed on most Brazilian theater stages, and in 1990 she hosted the re-opening of the Teatro Amazonas in Brazil. Outside her acting career, Torloni is also a member of the Amazon Forever Movement (Movimento Amazônia Para Sempre). She is of Italian, Native Brazilian, and Spanish descent.

Filmography

Television

Film

Theater 
 1979 – As Preciosas Ridículas
 1980 – Bodas de Papel
 1981 – The Bitter Tears of Petra von Kant
 1984 – Uncle Vanya
 1988 – O Lobo de Rayban... Julia Ferraz
 1989–  Orlando
 1993 – 10 Elevado a menos 43 – Extasis (in Portugal)
 1994 – Hamlet
 1997 – Salome... Salomé
 2000 – Joana D'Arc – A revolta ... Joana D'arc
 2002 – The Blue Room
 2004 – Paixão de Cristo: O Auto de Deus – Virgin Mary
 2005 – Mulheres por um Fio... Elise

Awards

References

External links 
 

1957 births
Living people
Actresses from São Paulo
Brazilian people of Portuguese descent
Brazilian people of Italian descent
Brazilian people of Spanish descent
Brazilian telenovela actresses
Brazilian stage actresses
Brazilian film actresses
Dancing with the Stars winners
20th-century Brazilian actresses
21st-century Brazilian actresses